Dawayne Bryan (born July 23, 1982) is an American professional racing driver. He competed in the ARCA Racing Series from 2005 to 2008 and earned one win at Chicagoland Speedway in 2005.

Racing career
Prior to making his debut in the ARCA Re/Max Series, Bryan had competed in series like the SARA Late Model Series, World Series of Asphalt Stock Car Racing, and the CRA Super Series.

Bryan first made his ARCA Re/Max Series debut in 2005 at Kentucky Speedway, driving the No. 12 Dodge owned by Mario Gosselin, where he would finish 34th due to a crash late in the race. He would return to the series at Chicagoland Speedway, this time driving a family-owned No. 65 Dodge. After starting fifth, he would lead the last 35 laps on route to his first ARCA win ahead of David Ragan.

In 2006, Bryan would run six races, splitting time bwtween his family-owned team and DGM Racing, earning a best finish of sixth at Kentucky. It was also during this year that Bryan attempted to make his NASCAR Busch Series debut at Homestead-Miami Speedway in the No. 68 Dodge for Bryan Racing, although he would fail to qualify.

Between 2007 and 2008, Bryan would solely run at Daytona International Speedway, finishing 11th in 2007 in the No. 63 Dodge for Bryan Racing, and finishing eighth in 2008 in the No. 72 Dodge. The latter start would be the last time he would compete in an ARCA race.

Motorsports results

NASCAR
(key) (Bold – Pole position awarded by qualifying time. Italics – Pole position earned by points standings or practice time. * – Most laps led.)

Busch Series

ARCA Re/Max Series
(key) (Bold – Pole position awarded by qualifying time. Italics – Pole position earned by points standings or practice time. * – Most laps led.)

References

1982 births
Living people
NASCAR drivers
ARCA Menards Series drivers
Racing drivers from Florida
People from Polk County, Florida